Shane Roden (born March 5, 1983) is an American politician who has served in the Missouri House of Representatives from the 111th district since 2015.

References

1983 births
Living people
Republican Party members of the Missouri House of Representatives
21st-century American politicians